A Gorgeous Girl Like Me, also known  as A Gorgeous Bird Like Me, is a 1972 French film directed by François Truffaut, starring Bernadette Lafont. It is based on Henry Farrell's 1967 novel of the same name.

Truffaut called it "a sarcastic comedy thriller."

Plot
Stanislas Previne is a young sociologist, preparing a thesis on criminal women. He meets Camille Bliss in prison to interview her. Camille is accused of having murdered her lover Arthur and her father. She tells Stanislas about her life and her love affairs.

Stanislas, much to the frustration of his secretary, who also has a crush on him, soon falls in love with Camille and works to find the evidence to prove her innocence. His secretary tries to convince the sociologist that Camille is a "manipulative slut" but he cannot be convinced. Through investigation, the sociologist and his secretary find a young boy, an amateur filmmaker, who has captured the evidence they need on film to secure Camille's release from prison.

Once free, Camille, who always has loved music and has seduced the cabaret singer Sam Golden earlier in the film, becomes a cause célèbre and a singing star. Stanislas meets her after a performance, and she seduces him at her home; however, her husband (who is cuckolded many times during the film) discovers them and beats him up. Camille kills her husband and then plants the gun on her passed-out paramour.

When Stanislas is imprisoned for murder, Camille will do nothing to help the man who once freed her. As he cleans up the prison in the film's final segment, the camera pans to show Stanislas' secretary typing a manuscript on a nearby balcony, presumably the thesis that Stanislas began, but this time preparing one that will expose Camille as the manipulative seductress that Stanislas discovered her to truly be.

Cast
 Bernadette Lafont as Camille Bliss
 André Dussollier as Stanislas Prévine
 Claude Brasseur as Maître Murene
 Charles Denner as Arthur
 Guy Marchand as Roger aka Sam Golden
 Anne Kreis as Hélène
 Philippe Léotard as Clovis Bliss
 Gilberte Géniat as Isobel Bliss
 Michel Delahaye as Marchal
 Danièle Girard as Florence Golden
 Martine Ferrière as prison secretary
 Jacob Weizbluth as Alphonse, the mute
 Jean-François Stévenin as the newspapers seller (uncredited)
 François Truffaut as a journalist (voice, uncredited)

References

External links 
 

1972 films
French comedy films
1970s French-language films
Films scored by Georges Delerue
Films directed by François Truffaut
Films with screenplays by Jean-Loup Dabadie
Films with screenplays by François Truffaut
Films based on American novels
1970s French films